Settam-e-Melli was a political movement in Afghanistan, led by Tahir Badakhshi. The organization was affiliated with the Non-Aligned Movement, and was opposed by both the Afghan monarchy and by the Soviet-aligned People's Democratic Party of Afghanistan. Its followers were mostly Persian speakers. Most of its members were non-Pashtuns—Tajik, Uzbek, and other minorities—and it has been variously described as an anti-Pashtun separatist group and as a Tajik and Uzbek separatist group. "Information on Settam-e-Melli is vague and contradictory, but it appears to have been an anti-Pashtun leftist mutation."

The group was founded in 1968 by Tahir Badakhshi, a Tajik who formerly had been a member of the Central Committee of the People's Democratic Party of Afghanistan and split with the party. The group emphasized "militant class struggle and mass mobilization of peasants" and recruited Tajiks, Uzbeks, and other minorities from Kabul and the northeastern provinces.

Responsibility for the kidnapping and murder of the American ambassador to Afghanistan, Adolph Dubs, on February 14, 1979 at the Kabul Hotel is sometimes attributed to Settam-e-Melli, but the true identity and aims of the militants who kidnapped Dubs is uncertain, and the circumstances are "still clouded." Some consider the allegation that Settam-e-Melli was responsible to be "dubious," pointing to a former Kabul policeman who has claimed that at least one kidnapper was part of the Parcham faction of the People's Democratic Party of Afghanistan.

During the Taraki-Amin period, the Setamis withdrew to the Afghan countryside, though as an urban movement this removed them from their powerbase.  During the 1979-1986 rule of communist president Babrak Karmal, the Setamis became closer with the government, partially as Karmal had been a personal friend of Badakhshi (who had been killed in 1979).  A Setami leader, Bashir Baghlani, went over to the government in 1983, and was made Minister of Justice.

The Setamis continued to play a prominent role among the non-Pashtun northeastern Afghan militias, playing a part in Ahmad Shah Massoud's defeat at Shahr-i Bozorg in 1990.

References

Notes

Communist parties in Afghanistan
Defunct political parties in Afghanistan